The S&P Europe 350 Dividend Aristocrats is the European equivalent of the S&P 500 Dividend Aristocrats. It is a stock index of European constituents that have followed a policy of consistently increasing dividends every year for at least 10 consecutive years. The index was launched on May 2, 2005. It is a subset of the S&P Europe 350. ETFs exist for the set of constituents. The constituents of the index are determined by rules set forth by Standard & Poor's.

Companies that meet the criteria for being a constituent of the S&P Europe 350 Dividend Aristocrats 
Components as of July 2021.

See also
S&P 500 Dividend Aristocrats
S&P Europe 350
Euro Stoxx 50

References 

S&P Dow Jones Indices
Pan-European stock market indices